The 2016 American Ultimate Disc League season was the fifth season for the league. The twenty-six teams were split into four regional divisions (East, Midwest, West and South), with each team playing a 14-game schedule. The second and third placed teams in each division advanced to a playoff match, with the winners facing the first placed team in their division. The winners of these matches advanced to the AUDL Championship Weekend, which featured semifinals and then a final for the AUDL Championship. The Dallas Roughnecks defeated the Seattle Cascades 33–27 in the final to become the 2016 AUDL Champions.

Regular season
Source: Rules for classification: 1) points; 2) head-to-head points; 3) head-to-head point difference.(C) Division champion, (Q) Qualified for the division playoffs

East Division

* Overtime win

** Second overtime win

Midwest Division

West Division

South Division

Postseason
Regional semifinal matches were played on July 16, with regional finals taking place on July 17 and July 23. Matches for the AUDL Semifinals were decided based on the seeding of teams from their results during the season.* Overtime win''

Division Playoffs

Division Finals

AUDL Championship Weekend

Semifinals

Final

See also
 2016 Major League Ultimate season
 UltiAnalytics AUDL team and player statistics

References

American Ultimate Disc League
American Ultimate Disc League